USRC Alabama, was a wood-hull topsail schooner designed by William Doughty that was commissioned in the United States Revenue Marine from 1819 to 1833. Assigned the homeport of Mobile, Alabama, she sailed the Caribbean extensively with her sister ship,  and was used mainly in anti-piracy activity.

Construction
On 6 April 1819, the Collector of Customs at New York City was authorized by the Treasury Department to build two cutters, one to be stationed in Louisiana and the other to be stationed at Mobile, Alabama. The cutters were constructed by the Christian Bergh Shipyard at New York City using plans drawn up by naval constructor William Doughty. Doughty designed plans for 31-ton, 51-ton, and 80-ton cutters for the Revenue Marine. Both were rigged as fore-topsail schooners with a square stern, raking masts, and light rails instead of heavy bulwarks. Both cutters were not armed initially, but were designed to accept a pivot gun amidships of a 9-pound to 18-pound capacity.

Service
After commissioning in New York City, Alabama was assigned a homeport at Mobile, Alabama on 11 August 1819.

Capture of pirate schooner Bravo
While on her voyage to her homeport at Mobile, on 31 August 1819, Alabama assisted her sister ship, Louisiana in the capture of the pirate vessel Bravo near Dry Tortugas. Bravo initiated the attack on Louisiana with a volley of musketry, during which the first officer and three crewmen were wounded.  The pirate ship was owned by Jean Lafitte and commanded by Jean Defarges, one of his lieutenants. Bravo had captured the Spanish schooner Filomena with a cargo of flour bound for Havana, Cuba out of Pensacola, Florida. The crew of Bravo were taken to New Orleans to await trial on charges of piracy while the passengers of Filomena were freed and returned to their ship. Following the action, Alabama was temporarily assigned at New Orleans on 20 October.

Footnotes

Citations

References

 
 
 
 
 

Ships of the United States Revenue Cutter Service
Ships of the United States Coast Guard
Ships built in New York City
Anti-piracy battles involving the United States
1819 ships